Saidye Rosner Bronfman  (9 December 1896 – 6 July 1995) was a Canadian-Jewish philanthropist. Her husband, Samuel Bronfman (1891–1971), founded the Seagram Company and the family took a leading role in the  Canadian-Jewish community.

Early life
Bronfman was born in Plum Coulee, Manitoba. Her mother, Priscilla Berger Rosner (1876–1951), was a homemaker who was also an immigrant to Canada from Odesa, Ukraine, Russian Empire. Saidye married Samuel Bronfman (1891–1971) in 1922 and two years later they moved to Montreal, Canada.

Career and philanthropy
Although Saidye was both born into and married into wealth, she was dedicated to charity. She lived by the principle of noblesse oblige. Prior to her marriage, Bronfman served as president of the Girls' Auxiliary of the Winnipeg Jewish Orphanage Society and later headed the Orphans' Home.

Beginning in 1929, she served as president of the Young Women's Hebrew Association in Montreal for six years. She was also founder and president of the Combined Jewish Appeal Women’s Division from 1931 to 1933, and in 1934 was one of the founders of Canadian Youth Aliyah.

In 1952, her husband Sam, established The Samuel and Saidye Bronfman Family Foundation, one of Canada’s major private granting foundations. The Saidye Bronfman Award was established in 1977 by the foundation to honour her 80th birthday.

This annual award for excellence in the fine crafts is now administered by the Canada Council for the Arts.

The Saidye Bronfman Centre for the Arts was named for her, prior to being renamed the Segal Centre in 2010. The Centre's founding artistic director was Marion Andre (January 12, 1920 – May 10, 2006, Le Havre, France).

Personal life
Saidye Bronfman had four children with her husband: Aileen Mindel "Minda" Bronfman de Gunzburg (1925–1985); wife of French-born Hessian Baron Alain de Gunzburg, Phyllis Bronfman Lambert, Edgar Miles Bronfman, and Charles Rosner Bronfman.

Saidye and Samuel lived mostly in Montreal but spent time in US in the 1950s to 1960s. Their American estate was in Tarrytown, New York. She died in Montreal.

References

External links
 Obituary in Jewish News Weekly of Northern California 
  Segal Centre, formerly the Saidye Bronfman Centre for the Arts
 Samuel & Saidye Bronfman Family Foundation
 The Bronfman Collection - The Canadian Museum of Civilization

1896 births
1995 deaths
Saidye Rosner Bronfman
Canadian people of Russian-Jewish descent
Jewish Canadian philanthropists
Canadian socialites
People from Winnipeg
20th-century philanthropists